Amalgamated Roadstone Corporation (ARC) was a British stone quarrying company.

History 
Amalgamated Roadstone Corporation Ltd. was formed on 23 April 1935 to acquire six quarry companies in Britain. These were Betty and Tom Ltd, Carreg-y-Liam Quarries Ltd, National Road Materials Ltd, National Roadstone Ltd, Port Nant Quarries Ltd, and Roads Reconstruction (1934) Ltd.

In 1947 ARC acquired the majority of the shares of the British Quarrying Co Ltd (BQC) and its associated quarries. By 1958 the company owned 58 quarries.

The company was acquired by Hanson plc as part of its acquisition of Consolidated Gold Fields in 1989.

Locations 
Locations of Quarries include:

Avon 

 Conygar Quarry, Clevedon (formally Roads Reconstruction (1934) Ltd.) - closed 1935
 Grovesend Quarries, Tytherington (formally Roads Reconstruction (1934) Ltd.)
 Sandford Quarry, Banwell (formally Roads Reconstruction (1934) Ltd.)
 Winford Quarry, Bristol (part of St. Kevern & Associated Quarried Ltd. subsidiary) - closed 1954

Cornwall 

 Penlee Quarries (formally Penlee Quarries Ltd.) - closed 1972
 Rosenython Quarry, St. Keverne (formally West of England Road-Metal Co. Ltd.)
 Stepper Point Quarry, Padstow (part of Cornish Road-Metal Ltd. subsidiary) - closed 1948
 Porthallow & Porthoustock Quarries, St. Keverne (part of St. Kevern & Associated Quarried Ltd. subsidiary) - closed 1958

East Lothian 

 East Saltoun Quarry, Pencaitland (part of Amalgamated Lime Co. Ltd.)

Kent 

 Borough Green Works, Borough Green (formally British Quarring Co. Ltd.)

Somerset 

 Cranmore Depot (formally Roads Reconstruction (1934) Ltd.)
 Emborough Quarry (formally Roads Reconstruction (1934) Ltd.) - closed 1965
 New Frome Quarry (formally Roads Reconstruction (1934) Ltd.)
 Vobster Quarry, Mells Road (formally Roads Reconstruction (1934) Ltd.) - closed 1966
 Windsor Hill Quarry, Shepton Mallet (formally Roads Reconstruction (1934) Ltd.) - closed 1942

Worcestershire 

 Malvern Central Plant Workshops

References 

Building materials companies of the United Kingdom
Non-renewable resource companies established in 1935
British companies established in 1935
1935 establishments in England
Non-renewable resource companies disestablished in 1989
1989 disestablishments in England
1989 mergers and acquisitions
British companies disestablished in 1989